Dideopsis  is a genus of hoverflies found in Asia and Australasia.

Species
Dideopsis aegrota (Fabricius, 1805)

References

Diptera of Asia
Diptera of Australasia
Syrphinae
Hoverfly genera
Taxa named by Shōnen Matsumura